Ian Christie (24 June 1927 – 19 January 2010) was an English jazz clarinetist best known for playing in a number of  trad jazz ensembles of the 1950s, including the Christie Brothers' Stompers, featuring Ken Colyer and Dickie Hawdon, with his brother, Keith Christie.

Their father was a piano tuner and banjoist who played in a local Blackpool banjo band. Ian took lessons under Charlie Farrell, but joined the Royal Air Force and took up photography as his primary interest. After Keith joined Humphrey Lyttelton's band, Ian soon followed; he completed his photography studies with Lyttelton's financial help. Ian also worked extensively with Mick Mulligan and George Melly in the 1950s and 1960s.

Aside from music, Christie worked as a film critic for The Daily Express for over 25 years and continuing to work as a photographer. He worked in trad jazz ensembles into the 2000s, with the Wyre Levee Stompers, the Merseysippi & Parade Jazz Band, and the Tony Davis Band, among others. In his later years, he played with Graham Tayar in his "Crouch End All Stars".

References

 Eugene Chadbourne, [ Ian Christie] at Allmusic

1927 births
2010 deaths
English jazz clarinetists
English film critics